Melphidippidae is a family of amphipods which rest upside-down and feed on particles of food suspended in the water. Three genera are recognised:
Melphidippa Boeck, 1871
Melphidippella Sars, 1894
Melphisubchela Andres, 1981

References

Gammaridea
Taxa named by Thomas Roscoe Rede Stebbing
Crustacean families